Christy Ottaviano Books is a book imprint based at:
Henry Holt and Company (2008-2020)
Little, Brown and Company (2020-present)